Chah Pat (also Romanized as Chāh Pat) is a village in Najafabad Rural District, in the Central District of Sirjan County, Kerman Province, Iran. At the 2006 census, its population was 91, in 18 families.

References 

Populated places in Sirjan County